Sigrid (Andersson) Rissler (1868-1918) was a Swedish botanist known for her work on monocotyledon anatomy.  She was daughter of Nils Johan Andersson, professor of botany at Lund University.

Works

References 

1868 births
1918 deaths
19th-century Swedish botanists
19th-century Swedish women scientists
20th-century Swedish botanists
Swedish women botanists
20th-century Swedish women scientists